International Day of Diplomats is celebrated on 24 October every year. The first International Day of Diplomats was celebrated in Brasília on 24 October 2017 with the participation of diplomats from Bangladesh, France, Ghana, India, Israel, Italy, Mexico, South Africa, and Turkey. Also Diplomats from Brazil, France, and European Union celebrated the 24th October in Lomé in 2017. Other diplomats from Austria, India, Brazil, Egypt, Netherlands and Zimbabwe among others took part in the celebrations of the second International Day of Diplomats. Ambassadors of the United States, European Union, African Union, India, South Korea, Algeria, Turkey, the Charge de Affaires of Russia, Egypt and diplomats of the Vatican, Switzerland among other countries celebrated the third International day of Diplomats in Antananarivo, Madagascar.  Fourth International Diplomats Day was celebrated globally. 
5th International Diplomats Day was celebrated across the world on 24th Oct 2021

History
Diplomats of some countries have their own days to celebrate their National Day of Diplomats, while many countries do not have a day of diplomats. Russian diplomats celebrate February 10 as Russian Diplomats Day while Indian diplomats celebrate October 9 as the Indian Foreign Service Day. Brazil celebrates April 20 as Brazil's Diplomats Day.

The idea of celebrating an International Day of Diplomats was proposed by Indian diplomat Abhay K.  to remember the diplomats of every country who play a vital role in maintaining world peace. He also organized the first International Day of Diplomats in Brasilia on 24 October 2017.  

2nd International Day of Diplomats was celebrated in Brasilia and other capitals with the participation of diplomats from several countries on 24 October 2018.  

3rd International Day of Diplomats was celebrated by the Ambassadors of the United States, European Union, African Union, India, South Korea, Algeria, Turkey, the Charge de Affaires of Russia, Egypt and diplomats of the Vatican, Switzerland among other countries in Antananarivo, Madagascar. 

4th International Diplomats Day was celebrated by diplomats across the world by posting messages on social media with #InternationalDiplomatsDay and #ServingPeopleGlobally. Events were held in Dubai and Madagascar and celebrities and general public too joined in the celebrations across the world.

National Day of Diplomats
: 17 January – Moldovan Diplomat's Day
: 10 February – Russian Diplomat's Day
: 20 April – Brazil's Diplomat's Day
: 9 October – Indian Foreign Service Day
: 3 November – Georgian Diplomat's Day
: 14 November – Colombian Diplomat's Day

References

External links
International Diplomats Day, United Nations 

National days
International observances